The NCAA Division III men's ice hockey tournament is an annual tournament to determine the top men's ice hockey team in NCAA Division III. The Division III championship was contested from 1984 through 2019, but then suspended due to COVID-19. The tournament resumed in the spring of 2022. The most successful team has been the Middlebury Panthers with eight titles.

Champions

Note: from 1988 through 1990 the championship round was a 2-game series where the first team to three points won (2 points for a win, 1 point for a tie). If the two teams remained tied after 2 games a 20-minute mini-game was held to determine the winner. Mini-game results are in italics.† Due to the COVID-19 pandemic, the NCAA did not hold any division III tournament during the 2020–21 season.

Team titles

Host cities

See also
NCAA Division I Men's Ice Hockey Championship
NCAA Division II Men's Ice Hockey Championship
National Collegiate Women's Ice Hockey Championship
NCAA Division III Women's Ice Hockey Championship

References
General

Division III
College men's ice hockey in the United States